Kʼinich Kʼan Joy Chitam II, also known as Kan Xul II and Kʼan Hokʼ Chitam On II, October 31, 644 – c.721, was an ajaw of the Maya city of Palenque. He took the throne on May 28, 702 (9.13.10.6.8), reigning until c.721. He succeeded his elder brother Kʼinich Kan Bahlam II. Their father was Kʼinich Janaab Pakal I ("Pacal the Great"), who had ruled for 68 years, and their mother was Lady Tzʼakbu Ajaw. His possible brother could be Tiwol Chan Mat. Kʼinich Kʼan Joy Chitam apparently reigned for about nine years. He was captured by the Toniná in 711 and was possibly executed by their leader, Kʼinich Baaknal Chaak or was later restored to his kingship. He was succeeded in late 721 by Kʼinich Ahkal Moʼ Nahb III.

Notes

Sources

External links
Possible representation of Kʼinich Kʼan Joy Chitam II

Rulers of Palenque
8th-century monarchs in North America
644 births
8th-century deaths
8th century in the Maya civilization